The Ministry of Vimukta Jati is a Ministry of the Government of Maharashtra. 
state.

The Ministry is headed by a cabinet level Minister. Atul Save is Current Minister of Vimukta Jati Government of Maharashtra.

Head office

List of Cabinet Ministers

List of Ministers of State

References 

Government of Maharashtra
Government ministries of Maharashtra